U.S. Route 169 (US 169) is a U.S. Highway that travels from Tulsa, Oklahoma to Virginia, Minnesota. In the state of Missouri, US 169 enters the state from Kansas overlapped with I-70 / US 24 / US 40 at Kansas City and exits the state into Iowa north of Irena.

Route description

US 169 enters Missouri from Kansas via the Lewis and Clark Viaduct overlapped with I-70 / US 24 / US 40. The highway leaves the overlap near an interchange with I-35 / Downtown Loop in the downtown area, traveling along Broadway Boulevard and crosses the Missouri River via the Buck O'Neil Bridge, becoming a freeway known as the Arrowhead Trafficway. North of the river, US 169 travels between Charles B. Wheeler Downtown Airport and the western edge of North Kansas City before running close to the river north of the airport. North of the Route 9 interchange, the freeway runs through a wooded area of the city and passes near Gladstone at the I-29 / US 71 interchange. US 169 passes near Metro North Mall at Barry Road, before becoming a more rural route at Route 152. The Arrowhead Trafficway ends at I-435, with US 169 becoming a four-lane divided expressway to Smithville.

North of Smithville, US 169 becomes a two-lane rural highway, passing through the towns of Trimble and Gower before entering St. Joseph. In St. Joseph, the highway intersects I-29 / US 71 twice and forms part of the Belt Highway in the eastern part of the city. Between I-29 and US 36, US 169 travels through an area that is mostly made up of commercial developments and north of US 36 it travels through areas that feature a mix between commercial and residential. The highway leaves St. Joseph after intersecting I-29 / US 71 a second time. North of St. Joseph, US 169's route is mostly rural. The highway has an overlap with US 136 from Stanberry to near Albany. North of US 136, US 169 travels through Gentry, Grant City, and Irena before exiting the state into Iowa.

Future
On May 18, 2018, MoDOT began construction on the Buck O'Neil Bridge, with plans to repair the expansion joints, cable keep replacements and partial scour remediation. The project is expected to last until December at a cost of $7 million. MoDOT eventually plans to completely replace the bridge, with an estimated cost of $150 million; construction would not begin until at least 2022.

Major intersections

See also

References

External links

 Missouri
Transportation in Jackson County, Missouri
Transportation in Clay County, Missouri
Transportation in Clinton County, Missouri
Transportation in Buchanan County, Missouri
Transportation in Andrew County, Missouri
Transportation in DeKalb County, Missouri
Transportation in Gentry County, Missouri
Transportation in Worth County, Missouri
Transportation in Kansas City, Missouri